The Norway men's national handball team represents Norway at international handball competitions, and is governed by the Norges Håndballforbund (NHF). As of 2022, Norway has been in 2 finals.

Honours

In 2016, they were honored with a Pierre de Coubertin World Fair Play Trophy for great sportsmanship.

Competitive record

Olympic Games

World Championship

European Championship

* Colored background indicates that medal was won on the tournament.
** Red border color indicates that tournament was held on home soil.

Other tournaments
 Gjensidige Cup 2019 – Winner
 Gjensidige Cup 2023 – Winner

Team

Current squad
The squad chosen for two qualification matches for the 2024 European Men's Handball Championship against Serbia in March 2023.

Caps and goals as of 12 March 2023.

Head coach: Jonas Wille

Coaching staff

Past squads
1958 World Men's Handball Championship (6th place)
 Oddvar Klepperås, Erik Vellan, Finn Arne Johansen, Knut Reese Larsen, Ivar Sandboe, Jonny Hovde, Jon Narvestad, Roy Yssen, Jan Flatla, Rolf Rustad, Kjell Svestad, John Tresse, Agnar Hagen, Odd Nielsen, Hans Lien.
Coach:

1961 World Men's Handball Championship (7th place)
 Kai Killerud, Knut Strøm, Finn Arne Johansen, Knut Reese Larsen, Kaj Ringlund, Bjørn Erik Sandsten, Svein Sand, Roy Yssen, Kjell Kleven, Rolf Rustad, Kjell Svestad, Arild Gulden, Ingar Engum, Gunnar Bergstrand.
Coach:

1964 World Men's Handball Championship (11th place)
 Carl Graff-Wang, Knut Strøm, Finn Arne Johansen, Arnulf Bæk, Oddvar Klepperås, Trygve Hegnar, Jan Petter Aas, Per Graver, Jan-Egil Uthberg, Rolf Rustad, Kjell Svestad, Arild Gulden, Erik Schønfeldt.
Coach: John Tresse

1967 World Men's Handball Championship (13th place)
 Carl Graff-Wang, Arnulf Bæk, Pål Cappelen, Pål Bye, Oddvar Klepperås, Inge K. Hansen, Jon Reinertsen, Per Graver, Jan-Egil Uthberg, Rolf Rustad, Kjell Svestad, Arild Gulden, Erik Schønfeldt, Jon Arne Gunnerud, Rolf Gustav Lundberg, Terje Høilund.
Coach: Kjell Kleven

1970 World Men's Handball Championship (13th place)
 Carl Graff-Wang, Arnulf Bæk, Pål Cappelen, Pål Bye, Harald Tyrdal, Inge K. Hansen, Jon Reinertsen, Per Graver, Jan-Egil Uthberg, Kai Killerud, Jan Otto Kvalheim, Jan Cato Nabseth, Robert Wagtskjold.
Coach: Kjell Kleven

1972 Summer Olympics (9th place)
 Carl Graff-Wang, Finn Urdal, Geir Røse, Harald Tyrdal, Arnulf Bæk, Inge K. Hansen, Jan Økseter, Jon Reinertsen, Pål Bye, Pål Cappelen, Per Søderstrøm, Per Axel Ankre, Roger Hverven, Sten Osther, Torstein Hansen, Ulf Magnusson.
Coach: Thor Ole Rimejorde

1993 World Men's Handball Championship (13th place)
 Svein Erik Bjerkrheim, Gunnar Fosseng, John Petter Sando, Roger Kjendalen, Sjur Bø Tollefsen, Ole Gustav Gjekstad, Rune Erland, Morten Schønfeldt, Øystein Havang, Kjetil Lundeberg, Fredrik Brubakken, Simen Muffetangen, Knut Håland, Morten Haugstvedt, Karl Erik Bøhn.
Coach: Gunnar Pettersen

1997 World Men's Handball Championship (12th place)
 Frode Scheie, Jan Thomas Lauritzen, Stein Olaf Sando, Stig Rasch, Sjur Bø Tollefsen, Preben Vildalen, Kristian Hansen, Marius Riise, Øystein Havang, Frode Hagen, Johnny Jensen, Steinar Ege, Geir Oustorp, Glenn Solberg, Stian Vatne.
Coach:  Harald Madsen

1999 World Men's Handball Championship (13th place)
 Frode Scheie, Jan Thomas Lauritzen, Svein-Erik Bjerkrheim, Stig Rasch, Tormod Moldestad, Thomas Pettersen, Stig Penne, Morten Daland, Christian Berge (captain), Frode Hagen, Rune Haugseng, Endre Nordli, Geir Oustorp, Tor Bjørn Andersen, Trond Førde Eriksen.
Coach: Christer Magnusson

2000 European Men's Handball Championship (8th place)
 Frode Scheie (captain), Jan Thomas Lauritzen, Stig Rasch, Tormod Moldestad, Stein Olaf Sando, Stig Penne, Vidar Gjesdal, Eivind Ellingsen, Christian Berge, Frode Hagen, Preben Vildalen, Gunnar Fosseng, Geir Oustorp, Thomas Pettersen, Sindre Walstad, Johnny Jensen.
Coach: Christer Magnusson

2001 World Men's Handball Championship (14th place)
 Steinar Ege, Jan Thomas Lauritzen, Håvard Tvedten, Kristian Hansen, Tormod Moldestad, Roger Kvannli, Stig Penne, Eivind Ellingsen, Christian Berge, Frode Hagen, Preben Vildalen, Gunnar Fosseng (captain), Trond Førde Eriksen, Rune Skjærvold, Johnny Jensen, Børge Lund.
Coach: Christer Magnusson

2005 World Men's Handball Championship (7th place)
 Steinar Ege, Glenn Solberg (captain), Håvard Tvedten, Frank Løke, Børge Lund, Frode Hagen, Preben Vildalen, Ole Erevik, Jarle Rykkje, Jan Thomas Lauritzen, Kristian Kjelling, Sindre Walstad, André Jørgensen, Johnny Jensen, Marius Riise, Rune Skjærvold.
Coach: Gunnar Pettersen

2006 European Men's Handball Championship (11th place)
 Steinar Ege (captain), Alexander Buchmann, Christian Berge, Frank Løke, Kjetil Strand, Ole Magnus Ekelund, Bjarte Myrhol, Børge Lund, Håvard Tvedten, Preben Vildalen, Ole Erevik, Jarle Rykkje, Jan Thomas Lauritzen, Kristian Kjelling, André Jørgensen, Johnny Jensen, Rune Skjærvold.
Coach: Gunnar Pettersen

2007 World Men's Handball Championship (13th place)
 Steinar Ege (captain), Alexander Buchmann, Erlend Mamelund, Frank Løke, Kjetil Strand, Jan-Richard Lislerud Hansen, Bjarte Myrhol, Børge Lund, Håvard Tvedten, Preben Vildalen, Ole Erevik, Jan Thomas Lauritzen, Kristian Kjelling, André Jørgensen, Johnny Jensen, Rune Skjærvold, Lars Erik Bjørnsen, Lars Olav Olaussen.
Coach: Gunnar Pettersen

2008 European Men's Handball Championship (6th place)
 Steinar Ege (captain), Glenn Solberg, Frode Hagen, Frank Løke, Kjetil Strand, Lars Erik Bjørnsen, Bjarte Myrhol, Børge Lund, Håvard Tvedten, Ole Erevik, Jan Thomas Lauritzen, Kristian Kjelling, André Jørgensen, Johnny Jensen, Thomas Skoglund, Rune Skjærvold.
Coach: Gunnar Pettersen

2009 World Men's Handball Championship (9th place)
 Steinar Ege (captain), Johnny Jensen, Stian Vatne, Thomas Drange, Frank Løke, Lars Erik Bjørnsen, Bjarte Myrhol, Håvard Tvedten, Erlend Mamelund, Ole Erevik, Christoffer Rambo, Alexander Buchmann, Kristian Kjelling, Svenn Erik Medhus, Vegard Samdahl, Thomas Skoglund, Christian Spanne.
Coach: Robert Hedin

2010 European Men's Handball Championship (7th place)
 Steinar Ege (captain), Stian Vatne, Frank Løke, Kjetil Strand, Lars Erik Bjørnsen, Bjarte Myrhol, Børge Lund, Håvard Tvedten, Erlend Mamelund, Ole Erevik, Christoffer Rambo, Kristian Kjelling, Vegard Samdahl, Thomas Skoglund, Einar Sand Koren, Christian Spanne, Magnus Dahl.
Coach: Robert Hedin

2011 World Men's Handball Championship (9th place)
 Steinar Ege (captain), Frank Løke, Kjetil Strand, Lars Erik Bjørnsen, Bjarte Myrhol, Børge Lund, Håvard Tvedten, Erlend Mamelund, Ole Erevik, Christoffer Rambo, Espen Lie Hansen, Kristian Kjelling, Vegard Samdahl, Thomas Skoglund, Einar Sand Koren, Eivind Tangen.
Coach: Robert Hedin

2012 European Men's Handball Championship (13th place)
 Kenneth Ryvoll Klev, Vegard Samdahl, Lars Erik Bjørnsen, Bjarte Myrhol, Børge Lund (captain), Håvard Tvedten, Erlend Mamelund, Ole Erevik, Christoffer Rambo, Espen Lie Hansen, Svenn Erik Medhus, Magnus Jøndal, Johnny Jensen, Einar Riegelhuth Koren, Sondre Paulsen, Kent Robin Tønnesen.
Coach: Robert Hedin

2014 European Men's Handball Championship (14th place)
 Magnus Dahl, Sander Sagosen, Bjarte Myrhol, Børge Lund (captain), Håvard Tvedten, Erlend Mamelund, Ole Erevik, Christoffer Rambo, Kent Robin Tønnesen, Christian O'Sullivan, Kristian Bjørnsen, André Lindboe, Magnus Gullerud, Kristian Kjelling, Harald Reinkind, Steffen Berg Løkkebø, Espen Lie Hansen.
Coach: Robert Hedin

2016 European Men's Handball Championship (4th place)
 Sander Sagosen, Thomas Kristensen, Joakim Hykkerud, Bjarte Myrhol (captain), Petter Øverby, Erlend Mamelund, Ole Erevik, Kent Robin Tønnesen, Espen Christensen, Magnus Jøndal, Kristian Bjørnsen, André Lindboe, Magnus Gullerud, Christian O'Sullivan, Harald Reinkind, Espen Lie Hansen.
Coach: Christian Berge

2017 World Men's Handball Championship (2nd place)
 Sander Sagosen, Joakim Hykkerud, Bjarte Myrhol (captain), Petter Øverby, Ole Erevik, Kent Robin Tønnesen, Espen Christensen, Magnus Jøndal, Kristian Bjørnsen, André Lindboe, Magnus Gullerud, Magnus Abelvik Rød, Christian O'Sullivan, Eivind Tangen, Gøran Johannessen, Torbjørn Bergerud, Espen Lie Hansen.
Coach: Christian Berge

2018 European Men's Handball Championship (7th place)
 Sander Sagosen, Joakim Hykkerud, Bjarte Myrhol (captain), Henrik Jakobsen, Kent Robin Tønnesen, Espen Christensen, Magnus Jøndal, Kristian Bjørnsen, Magnus Gullerud, Gøran Sørheim, Gøran Johannessen, Christian O'Sullivan, Eivind Tangen, Harald Reinkind, Torbjørn Bergerud, Espen Lie Hansen, Magnus Abelvik Rød, Kristian Sæverås.
Coach: Christian Berge

2019 World Men's Handball Championship (2nd place)
 Sander Sagosen, Bjarte Myrhol (captain), Henrik Jakobsen, Petter Øverby, Espen Christensen, Magnus Jøndal, Kristian Bjørnsen, Magnus Gullerud, Gøran Johannessen, Christian O'Sullivan, Eivind Tangen, Harald Reinkind, Torbjørn Bergerud, Kevin Gulliksen, Alexander Blonz, Magnus Abelvik Rød, Espen Lie Hansen.
Coach: Christian Berge

2020 European Men's Handball Championship (3rd place)
 Tom Kåre Nikolaisen, Sander Sagosen, Sander Øverjordet, Petter Øverby, Kristian Sæverås, Espen Christensen, Magnus Jøndal, William Aar, Kristian Bjørnsen (captain), Magnus Gullerud, Gøran Johannessen, Christian O'Sullivan, Eivind Tangen, Harald Reinkind, Torbjørn Bergerud, Kevin Gulliksen, Alexander Blonz, Magnus Abelvik Rød.
Coach: Christian Berge

2021 World Men's Handball Championship (6th place)
 Sander Sagosen, Sander Øverjordet, Bjarte Myrhol (captain), Henrik Jakobsen, Petter Øverby, Kristian Sæverås, Kent Robin Tønnesen, Espen Christensen, Magnus Jøndal, William Aar, Kristian Bjørnsen, Gøran Johannessen, Christian O'Sullivan, Eivind Tangen, Simen Holand Pettersen, Harald Reinkind, Torbjørn Bergerud, Thomas Solstad, Kevin Gulliksen, Alexander Blonz.
Coach: Christian Berge

2020 Summer Olympics (7th place)
 Sander Sagosen, Bjarte Myrhol (captain), Magnus Fredriksen, Petter Øverby, Kristian Sæverås, Kent Robin Tønnesen, Magnus Jøndal, Kristian Bjørnsen, Magnus Gullerud, Christian O'Sullivan, Simen Holand Pettersen, Harald Reinkind, Torbjørn Bergerud, Kevin Gulliksen, Magnus Abelvik Rød.
Coach: Christian Berge

2022 European Men's Handball Championship (5th place)
 Vetle Eck Aga, Sander Sagosen, Sebastian Barthold, Sander Øverjordet, Petter Øverby, Kristian Sæverås, Erik Thorsteinsen Toft, Kent Robin Tønnesen, Sander Heieren, Kristian Bjørnsen, Magnus Gullerud, Christian O'Sullivan (captain), Simen Holand Pettersen, Harald Reinkind, Endre Langaas, Torbjørn Bergerud, Thomas Solstad, Kevin Gulliksen, Alexander Blonz, Christoffer Rambo.
Coach: Christian Berge

2023 World Men's Handball Championship (6th place)
 Vetle Eck Aga, Sander Sagosen, Sebastian Barthold, Sander Øverjordet, Petter Øverby, Kristian Sæverås, Erik Thorsteinsen Toft, Kristian Bjørnsen, Magnus Gullerud, Gøran Johannessen, Christian O'Sullivan (captain), Harald Reinkind, Tobias Grøndahl, Torbjørn Bergerud, Thomas Solstad, Kevin Gulliksen, Alexander Blonz, Magnus Abelvik Rød.
Coach: Christian Berge

Coaches
 John Tresse (1961–1965)
 Kjell Kleven (1965–1970)
 Thor Ole Rimejorde (1970–1973)
 Thor Nohr (1973–1977)
 Roar Østerbø (1977–1979)
 Per Otto Furuseth (1979–1985)
 Bertil Andersén (1985–1989)
 Gunnar Pettersen (1989–1994)
 Harald Madsen (1994–1997)
 Ivica Rimanić (1997)
 Christer Magnusson (1998–2001)
 Gunnar Pettersen (2001–2008)
 Robert Hedin (2008–2014)
 Christian Berge (2014–2022)
 Jonas Wille (2022–)

Captains
 Christian Berge (World Championship, 1999)
 Frode Scheie (European Championship, 2000)
 Gunnar Fosseng (World Championship, 2001)
 Glenn Solberg (World Championship, 2005)
 Steinar Ege (European Championship, 2006, 2008, 2010, World Championship, 2007, 2009, 2011)
 Børge Lund (European Championship, 2012, 2014)
 Bjarte Myrhol (European Championship, 2016, 2018, World Championship, 2017, 2019, 2021, Olympic Games 2020)
 Kristian Bjørnsen (European Championship, 2020)
 Christian O'Sullivan (European Championship, 2022, World Championship, 2023)
Incomplete

Notable players
Several Norwegian players have seen their individual performance recognized at international tournaments, as a member of the All-Star Team or top scorer.
All-Star Team
Frank Løke, 2008 European Championship
Håvard Tvedten, 2011 World Championship
Sander Sagosen, 2016, 2018 and 2020 European Championship, 2017 and 2019 World Championship
Kristian Bjørnsen, 2017 World Championship
Bjarte Myrhol, 2017 and 2019 World Championship
Magnus Jøndal, 2019 World Championship, 2020 European Championship
Top scorers
Sander Sagosen, 2020 European Championship (65 goals)

Individual all-time records

Most matches played
Total number of matches played in official competitions only.

Last updated: 3 August 2021Source: handball.no

Most goals scored
Total number of goals scored in official matches only.

Last updated: 12 March 2023Source: handball.no

References

External links

IHF profile

Handball in Norway
Men's national handball teams
Handball
Recipients of the Pierre de Coubertin medal